The College of Arts and Sciences (A&S) is the liberal arts and sciences unit of the University of Kentucky, located in Lexington, Kentucky. It is primarily divided between the natural sciences, social sciences, and humanities, and offers more than thirty degree options for both undergraduate and graduate students.

The college is home to 5,200 undergraduate students, 960 graduate students, 50 postdoctoral students, and 350 faculty members.  The College of Arts and Sciences is led by award-winning professors and researchers who have been recognized by such organizations as the Fulbright Scholar Program, National Science Foundation, and National Endowment for the Humanities. The College of Arts and Sciences features programs in Hispanic Studies, Human Geography, and Clinical Psychology each ranked in the top twenty among public institutions.

The mission of the college is to facilitate the learning of a diverse student population through an educational curriculum emphasizing the humanities, social sciences, and natural sciences. The college is dedicated to the idea that its students should have the ability to engage with diverse fields of knowledge and to think critically about the human and natural worlds.

History of the college

The College of Arts and Science was established April 14, 1908 by James K. Patterson, the first president of the University of Kentucky, as part of Patterson's initiative to create  a college within the university that would provide solid educational training in the sciences, arts, and humanities.

The Graduate School was formally established in 1912, and by 1919, UK was one of only 130 institutions in the United States whose graduate school had been accepted to the National Association of State Universities.

In 1918, President Frank McVey expanded the college from 13 departments to 22 and added the "s" to Sciences (thus making it the College of Arts and Sciences). McVey insisted on hiring faculty members with doctorates to make the university more competitive.

To accommodate the growing numbers of students during the 1931-32 academic year, UK built several new buildings, including the Biological Sciences building, Erikson Hall (built as the Home Economics Building), and an enlarged ROTC building.

In 1945, the College of Arts and Sciences began recognizing individual faculty members with the Distinguished Professor Award, the first of which was awarded to Grant Knight of the English Department. 1947 also saw Paul G. Blazer and his wife Georgia launch the still-ongoing Blazer Lecture Series to showcase the talent of university faculty and other members of the academic community.

Sociology major William Augustus Jones, Jr., and English minor Doris Wilkinson represented A&S in UK's first graduating class of African-Americans in 1958.  Joseph Walter Scott, UK's first African-American professor, was hired by the Sociology Department in 1965 and was joined later in 1967 by Doris Wilkinson, who became the first female African-American professor in the school's history.

During the same time – and in response to an increasingly tense political climate – the College of Arts and Sciences opened the Patterson School for Diplomacy.

The college's location on UK's campus was centralized by the construction of Patterson Office Tower. Completed in 1969, the Office Tower and adjacent Whitehall Classroom Building gave the College of Arts and Sciences additional classrooms and office spaces.

In 1974, Judith Lesnaw was hired on as the first woman in Biology, and she later became the first woman to receive tenure at the university.

William Nunn Lipscomb earned a bachelor's degree at Kentucky and completed his education and a distinguished academic career out-of-state, was awarded the Nobel Prize in Chemistry in 1976 for his studies on borane structure and chemical bonding.

As interest in Appalachia grew during the 1970s, UK opened the Appalachian Center in 1977 and developed a widely recognized curriculum in Appalachian Studies.

In the 2005 Faculty Scholarly Activity Index, UK's Hispanic Studies Department was ranked as best among American universities. The college's programs in philosophy and religious studies also achieved high ranking in the same index.

Today, the University of Kentucky's primary goal is to become a Top 20 university by the year 2020. Since all students take classes in the College of Arts and Sciences, A&S plays an important role in working towards that goal. A&S is now the largest college in the university, and leads UK in the number of University Research Professorships.

Departments

The College of Arts and Sciences features 18 traditional departments, offering majors leading to B.A., B.S., M.A., M.S., M.Phil., and Ph.D. degrees.
Anthropology
Biology
Chemistry
Earth & Environmental Sciences
Economics
English
Gender & Women's Studies
Geography
Hispanic Studies
History
Mathematics
Modern and Classical Languages, Literatures and Cultures
Philosophy
Physics & Astronomy
Political Science
Psychology
Sociology
Statistics

Programs

In addition to its departments, the College of Arts and Sciences also houses 19 interdisciplinary programs and committees:
Aerospace Studies/Air Force Reserve Officer Training Corps
Africana Studies
American Studies
Appalachian Studies
Cognitive Science
Environmental Studies
Foreign Language and International Economics
Indian Culture
International Studies
Islamic Studies
Japan Studies
Judaic Studies
Latin American Studies
Linguistics
Mathematical Economics
Military Science/Army Reserve Officers' Training Corps
Social Theory
Topical Studies
Writing, Rhetoric and Digital Studies

Faculty awards and grants

Faculty in the College of Arts and Sciences have been awarded grants from such institutes as the National Science Foundation, National Institute on Alcohol Abuse and Alcoholism, National Institute on Drug Abuse, US Department of Education, and National Institutes of Health. Similarly, faculty members have received many national and international fellowships, including awards from the Guggenheim Foundation, Fulbright Program, National Endowment for the Humanities, and Humboldt Foundation.

Research funding

Professors in the College of Arts and Sciences account for 60% of the researchers at the University of Kentucky. In addition to multiple grants and fellowships, the College of Arts and Sciences has $45 million in collaborate external grants and ranks first in the number of grad student publications among colleges at the university.

Deans of the college

 Arthur M. Miller, 1908-1917
 Paul P. Boyd, 1917-1947
 Martin M. White, 1947-1965
 Paul Nagel, 1966-1969
 Wimberly Royster, 1969-1972
 Art Gallaher, 1972-1980
 Donald Sands (Acting Dean), 1980-1981
 Michael Baer, 1981-1990
 Bradley C. Canon (Acting Dean), 1990-1991
 Richard Edwards, 1991-1997
 Donald Sands (Acting Dean) 1997-1998
 Howard Grotch, 1998-2003
 Steven L. Hoch, 2003-2009
 Phil Harling (Acting Dean), 2008-2009
 Mark L. Kornbluh, 2009–2020
 Christian M. M. Brady, 2020–present

Publications
Ampersand, the magazine of the College of Arts and Sciences, is published twice yearly for alumni, faculty, and friends of the college.
Limestone,  a journal of art and literature that is edited and published annually by graduate students in the Department of English.
disclosure: A Journal of Social Theory, an annual thematic publication of contemporary social theory produced by the Committee on Social Theory.

References

External links
 College of Arts and Sciences website
 Ampersand Magazine
 Limestone
 disclosure: A Journal of Social Theory

Liberal arts colleges at universities in the United States
University of Kentucky
1908 establishments in Kentucky